A menntaskóli is an Icelandic equivalent to a gymnasium (high school, or college), although it works differently from other countries.

In Iceland grade school (grunnskóli) starts in 1st grade at the age of 6 and ends in 10th grade at the age of 16, which are the only mandatory school years in Iceland. After graduation from grade school, students choose what High Schools/College they wish to go to (this is similar to choosing a college in the United States). It is all based on what students wish to learn. It is a 3-year term; roughly the equivalent of the last three years of high school and the first year of university in the United States. A completion of menntaskóli usually provides the student with stúdentspróf (upper secondary certificate) which is required for entry to most university programs in Iceland. Stúdentspróf is somewhat equivalent to a JR college diploma in the US.

List of Icelandic Secondary Schools
 Borgarholtsskóli (Borgó) (Reykjavík)
 Fjölbrautaskóli Vesturlands á Akranesi (FVA) (Akranes)
 Fjölbrautaskóli Norðurlands Vestra (FNV) (Sauðárkrókur)
 Fjölbrautaskóli Snæfellinga (FSN) (Grundarfjörður)
 Fjölbrautaskóli Suðurlands (FSu) (Selfoss)
 Fjölbrautaskóli Suðurnesja (FS) (Reykjanesbær)
 Fjölbrautaskólinn í Breiðholti (FB) (Reykjavík)
 Fjölbrautaskólinn í Garðabæ (FG) (Garðabær)
 Fjölbrautaskólinn við Ármúla (FÁ) (Reykjavík)
 Flensborgarskóli (Hafnarfjörður)
 Framhaldsskólinn á Húsavík (FSH) (Húsavík)
 Framhaldsskólinn á Laugum (Laugar)
 Framhaldsskólinn í Austur-Skaftafellssýslu (FAS) (Höfn)
 Framhaldsskólinn í Mosfellsbæ (FMOS) (Mosfellsbær)
 Framhaldsskólinn í Vestmannaeyjum (FÍV) (Vestmannaeyjar)
 Kvennaskóli Íslands (Kvennó) (Reykjavík)
 Menntaskólinn á Akureyri (MA) (Akureyri)
 Menntaskólinn við Hamrahlíð (MH) (Reykjavík)
 Menntaskólinn við Sund (MS) (Reykjavík)
 Menntaskóli Borgarfjarðar (MB) (Borgarnes)
 Menntaskólinn á Ásbrú (MÁ) (Reykjanesbær)
 Menntaskólinn á Ísafirði (MÍ) (Ísafjörður)
 Menntaskólinn á Egilsstöðum (ME) (Egilsstaðir)
 Menntaskólinn á Tröllaskaga (MTR) (Ólafsfjörður)
 Menntaskólinn í Reykjavík (MR) (Reykjavík)
 Menntaskólinn að Laugarvatni (ML) (Laugarvatn)
 Menntaskólinn í Kópavogi (MK) (Kópavogur)
 Tækniskólinn (Reykjavík)
 Verkmenntaskóli Austurlands (VA) (Neskaupstaður)
 Verkmenntaskólinn á Akureyri (VMA) (Akureyri)
 Verzlunarskóli Íslands (Verzló), (Reykjavík)

School types
Education in Iceland